Osbornodon ("Osborn's tooth") is an extinct genus of canid that were endemic to North America and which lived from the Oligocene to the Early Miocene, 33.9—15.97 Ma (AEO), existing for approximately .
 It was the last surviving genus of the hesperocyonine subfamily, the oldest subfamily of canids.

Species
Seven known species of Osbornodon existed: 
Osbornodon brachypus Cope 1881
Osbornodon fricki Wang 1994 (18 Ma)
Osbornodon iamonensis Sellards 1916 (21 Ma)
Osbornodon renjiei Wang 1994 (33 Ma)
Osbornodon sesnoni Macdonald 1967 (32 Ma)
Osbornodon scitulus Hay 1924
Osbornodon wangi Hayes 2000

The earlier species were about the size of a small fox, and had teeth suggesting an omnivorous or hypocarnivorous diet. Later species were larger and more actively predaceous. The last species, O. fricki, was about the size of a large wolf.

References

R. M. Nowak. 1991. Walker's Mammals of the World. Maryland, Johns Hopkins University Press (edited volume) II (K. Behrensmeyer/K. Behrensmeyer/J. Alroy)

Hesperocyonines
Oligocene canids
Miocene carnivorans
Prehistoric carnivoran genera
Burdigalian genus extinctions
Prehistoric mammals of North America
Rupelian genus first appearances